The Tidewater Conference of Independent Schools (TCIS) is a 10-team athletic conference in the Tidewater region of Virginia.  Prior to the 2004 school year, the TCIS had tournaments for JV and Middle School teams as well as Varsity.  Now, the TCIS only holds tournaments for Varsity teams.

Schools in the conference advance to state championships governed by the Virginia Independent Schools Athletic Association (the Virginia High School League is open only to public schools).

Sports
The TCIS hold tournaments for 18 different sports including: 
Boys Volleyball 
Girls Volleyball
Boys Soccer
Girls Soccer
Cross Country
Wrestling
Boys Basketball
Girls Basketball
Swimming
Girls Softball 
Boys Baseball 
Boys Lacrosse 
Girls Lacrosse
Boys Tennis 
Girls Tennis
Track 
Golf 
Girls Field Hockey
Cheerleading
Sailing

Teams
Cape Henry Collegiate School 
Catholic High School
Greenbrier Christian Academy
Hampton Roads Academy
Nansemond-Suffolk Academy 
Norfolk Academy
Norfolk Christian School 
Norfolk Collegiate School 
Peninsula Catholic High School
The Steward School 
Walsingham Academy

2014-2015 Winners

2012-2013 Winners

2010-2011 Winners

*Cape Henry Collegiate went on to win the state VIS State Championship in Girls Volleyball, Boys Volleyball, Girls Basketball and Field Hockey

2009-2010 Winners

2008-2009 Winners

2007-2008 Winners

Norfolk Collegiate was also the VIS (Virginia Independent Schools) Division II champion in girls tennis.
Hampton Roads Academy was also the VIS Division II champion in boys swimming.
Walsingham was also the VIS Division II champion in girls basketball.
Greenbrier Christian was also the VIS Division II champion in baseball.

2006-2007 Winners

Sports in Hampton Roads
High school sports in Virginia